Monale is a comune (municipality) in the Province of Asti in the Italian region Piedmont, located about  southeast of Turin and about  northwest of Asti.

Monale borders the following municipalities: Asti, Baldichieri d'Asti, Castellero, Cinaglio, Cortandone, Maretto, and Villafranca d'Asti.

Demographic evolution

Twin towns — sister cities
Monale is twinned with:

  Cazouls-d'Hérault, France (2010)

References

Cities and towns in Piedmont